Mohammad Rostami (born September 15, 1985) is an Iranian footballer who plays for Malavan F.C. in the IPL.

Club career
Rostami has played his entire career with Malavan F.C.

Club career statistics
Last Update: 22 August 2011

References

1985 births
Living people
Malavan players
Damash Gilan players
Sepidrood Rasht players
Iranian footballers
Association football defenders